Kho or KHO may refer to:

Kho, the Hokkien romanization of the Chinese surname Xu (surname)
Kho (cooking technique), a cooking technique in Vietnamese cuisine
Kho (costume) (or Bakhu), a traditional outfit worn by Bhutia, ethnic Tibetans of Sikkim
Kho people, a people of Pakistan
Kho language, or Khowar, a language of Pakistan
Kara Harp Okulu (KHO), a Turkish military academy
Kho kho, a South Asian sport
Khao Kho, a mountain in Phetchabun Province, Thailand

People with the name
Baldwin Kho (born 1971), Filipino visual artist and humanitarian
Elisa Olga Kho, Philippine politician
Hayden Kho (born 1980), Filipino cosmetic surgeon, entrepreneur, actor and model
Kho Sin-Kie (born 1912), Indonesian-born tennis player who represented the Republic of China in the Davis Cup
Kho Orluk (born 1580), Oirat prince and Tayishi of the Torghut-Oirat tribe
Kho Jabing (1984–2016), Malaysian man sentenced to death for murder in Singapore
Kho Nai Guan (1956–2002), Singaporean murder victim

See also
 
 Khoe (disambiguation)
 Khoisan (disambiguation)

Language and nationality disambiguation pages